Dmitri Anatolyevich Davydov (born 22 January 1975) is a Russian professional football manager and a former player. He is the manager for FC Zenit-2 Saint Petersburg.

Playing career
He made his debut in the Russian Premier League in 1996 for FC Zenit St. Petersburg.

Personal life
He is a son of the former FC Zenit St. Petersburg player and manager Anatoli Davydov.

External links
 Profile at the official RFPL site

References

1975 births
Living people
Russian footballers
Russia under-21 international footballers
FC Zenit Saint Petersburg players
FC Luch Vladivostok players
FC Metallurg Lipetsk players
Russian Premier League players
Association football defenders
FC Dynamo Saint Petersburg players
FC Zenit-2 Saint Petersburg players